The Little Noise Sessions was a series of acoustic charity concerts held annually at the Union Chapel, and at St. John at Hackney from 2011 in November, although one was held in Exeter in December 2009. The proceeds of ticket sales were donated to the charity, Mencap. The concerts were hosted by Jo Whiley.

The line-up varies for each night (headline act in bold).

2006

 19 November 2006 - KT Tunstall
 20 November 2006 - The Kooks / Plan B / Get Cape. Wear Cape. Fly
 21 November 2006 - Paolo Nutini / M Craft
 22 November 2006 - Guillemots / Mystery Jets / Jamie T
 23 November 2006 - The Fratellis / The View / Mohair
 24 November 2006 - Amy Winehouse / Bat for Lashes / Mika
 25 November 2006 - Noel Gallagher
 26 November 2006 - James Morrison / The Automatic / Newton Faulkner / Lily Allen

2007

21 November 2007 - Athlete  / The Hoosiers /  Palladium /  Cass Lowe
22 November 2007 - Will Young / David Jordan / Adele / Newton Faulkner
23 November 2007 - Biffy Clyro / We Are Scientists / The Courteeners / U2*
24 November 2007 - The Kooks / The Pigeon Detectives / The Metros / One Night Only
25 November 2007 - Snow Patrol  / Declan O'Rourke / Róisín Murphy / Cajun Dance Party
26 November 2007 - Kate Nash / Robyn / The Ting Tings / Special Guest Billy Bragg
27 November 2007 - The Enemy / The Wombats / Noah and the Whale
28 November 2007 - Keane / Rilo Kiley / Duffy
U2 were unannounced surprise guests. Bono & The Edge played "Stay", "Desire", "Angel of Harlem" and "Wave of Sorrow".

2008

8 November 2008 - Glasvegas / White Lies and Cage the Elephant with surprise guests The Killers
9 November 2008 - Razorlight, Florence and the Machine, Esser and Skint & Demoralised
10 November 2008 - Stereophonics / Seasick Steve / Duke Special and General Fiasco
11 November 2008 - Adele and Damien Rice and Angus and Julia Stone
12 November 2008 - Biffy Clyro / Friendly Fires and Frank Turner
13 November 2008 - James Morrison / Katy Perry / Sam Beeton and Dan Black
14 November 2008 - Kasabian / Reverend and the Makers and The Hours with guest compere The Edge
15 November 2008 - Keane / The Script / Bryn Christopher / Red Light Company and Absent Elk
18 November 2008 - The Fratellis / Noah and the Whale / Ladyhawke and Sergeant

2009

16 November 2009 - Editors / The Maccabees / Bombay Bicycle Club / Everything Everything (band)
17 November 2009 - Alexandra Burke / Alphabeat / Marina and the Diamonds / VV Brown
18 November 2009 - Mika / Paloma Faith / Alex Gardner / Daisy Dares You
19 November 2009 - Richard Hawley / Corinne Bailey Rae / I Blame Coco / Alex Turner
20 November 2009 - Lostprophets / The Blackout / The King Blues / Egyptian Hip Hop
21 November 2009 - Taio Cruz / Tinchy Stryder / Chipmunk (Cancelled)
22 November 2009 - Florence and the Machine / Golden Silvers / Erik Hassle / Ellie Goulding
23 November 2009 - David Gray / The Low Anthem / Lisa Mitchell
24 November 2009 - Newton Faulkner / Scouting for Girls / Little Comets / Stornoway
19 December 2009, in Exeter - Coldplay / Lily Allen (pulled out due to illness) / La Roux / six members of Tiverton Town Band.

2010

15 November 2010 - Ting Tings / Tom Jones / Lauren Pritchard 
16 November 2010 - Jessie J / Paolo Nutini / Rumer / Daisy Dares You
17 November 2010 - Hurts / Claire Maguire / Saint Saviour
18 November 2010 - Example / We Are Scientists
20 November 2010 - Ellie Goulding

2011

22 November 2011 - Elbow / Maverick Sabre 
23 November 2011 - Marina and the Diamonds, Icona Pop, Spark
25 November 2011 - Goldfrapp, Alpines
26 November 2011  - Example / Ed Sheeran/ Birdy
27 November 2011 - Sinead O'Connor, King Creosote

2012

19 November 2012 - Gary Barlow and guests
20 November 2012 - Olly Murs / Loveable Rogues / Lawson 
21 November 2012 - Richard Hawley with First Aid Kit and King Charles
23 November 2012 - Maccabees / Jessie Ware / Jamie N Commons
24 November 2012 - Noah & The Whale / Lucy Rose / Villagers / Tom Odell
25 November 2012 - Amy Macdonald / Newton Faulkner / Karin Park

2014
22 October 2014 - Jake Bugg / Syd Arthur
23 October 2014 - David Gray / Rhodes

External links
 Official site

Music festivals in London